Alexis David Duarte Pereira (born 12 March 2000) is a Paraguayan professional footballer who plays as a centre-back for Russian Premier League club Spartak Moscow.

Club career
Duarte started his career with Paraguayan Primera División side Cerro Porteño, making his professional debut in April 2019 playing the whole match in a 3–0 win over Club Nacional. In January 2021, Duarte agreed a move to Liga MX side Club Necaxa but the move fell through due to injury. In January 2023, he joined Russian Premier League side Spartak Moscow on a four-and-a-half year deal for $5 million.

International career
Having represented his country in the 2017 FIFA U-17 World Cup and the 2019 South American U-20 Championship, Duarte earned his first call-up to the Paraguay senior team in September 2021 for their World Cup qualifiers.

Career statistics

Club

References

External links

Living people
2000 births
Paraguayan footballers
Association football defenders
Paraguay youth international footballers
Paraguayan Primera División players
Russian Premier League players
Cerro Porteño players
FC Spartak Moscow players
Paraguayan expatriate footballers
Paraguayan expatriate sportspeople in Russia
Expatriate footballers in Russia